Oopelma is a genus of horse flies in the family Tabanidae.

Species
Oopelma globicorne (Wiedemann, 1821)

References

Tabanidae
Diptera of South America
Taxa named by Günther Enderlein
Brachycera genera